The Royal Commission on Industrial Relations, otherwise known as the Mathers Commission, was chaired by Thomas Graham Mathers and examined Canada's industrial relations. The Commission was originally titled Commission to Inquire Into and Report Upon Industrial Relations in Canada. The report released its findings in July 1919, after the Commissioners visited 28 cities from 26 April to 16 June, hearing from 486 witnesses from British Columbia in the West to Nova Scotia in the East. In order to collect evidence the Commission advertised their arrival in the newspapers of the 28 industrial centres visited. The witnesses included representatives of employees and employers. Many groups prepared statements in advance for their respected collective views. In the report the Commissioner is quoted:...I desire to very briefly give the reasons why this Commission has been appointed; the general topics upon which we desire to obtain information, and the results which we hope and trust may be achieved by our work. The upheaval taking place throughout the world, and the state of men's minds during this critical period, make this the time for drastic changes of the industrial and social systems of Canada. In view of this, the Government has created this Commission on Industrial Relations, charged with the duty of considering and making suggestions for establishing permanent improvements in the relations between employers and employees.

Although the Commission is considered to be a legislative failure, it nevertheless remains valuable for its account of the rise of militancy in the Canadian labour movement following the First World War.

References

Royal commissions in Canada